Dick's Picks Volume 20 is the 20th installment of the popular Grateful Dead archival series. It documents the majority of the concerts on September 25, 1976 at the Capital Centre in Landover, Maryland and September 28, 1976 at the Onondaga County War Memorial in Syracuse, New York.

It is mastered in HDCD from the original recordings by Dan Healy. The recordings are from a period when the band was transitioning out of their long touring hiatus, trying out new songs on the road, and welcoming back second drummer, Mickey Hart. The last performance of "Cosmic Charlie" is on this installment. Though not represented on this release, "Bertha" was also performed on the 28th, and "It's All Over Now" on the 25th. The show from the night before the latter concert was released on Dave's Picks Volume 4.

Enclosure

The release includes two sheets of paper stapled together in the middle, yielding an eight-page enclosure. The front duplicates the cover of the CD and the back features a circular outline of a stealie skull in red over a color photograph of a path in the woods extending into the distance.

The first two pages feature a collage consisting of a ticket stub for the September 28th show and a fan letter from "A Dead Head" along with three black-and-white photographs of Jerry Garcia, Phil Lesh with Donna Jean Godchaux, and Bob Weir.  The fan letter states that its author has "always felt it to be unfair to force Dead Heads to turn to illegitimate & poor quality bootlegs" and suggests the band "put out a line of recordings of your concerts." Behind these items is a background photo of the orange leaves of a maple tree in autumn.

The middle two pages feature a photomontage of three color photographs of Keith Godchaux, Bill Kruetzmann with Mickey Hart, and the entire band on stage with a grey-ish background containing a blurry wing.  The last two pages list the contents of and credits for the release, against a background containing a dark blue photograph of a crescent moon at the bottom of the second page.

Track listing

September 25, 1976 – Capital Centre, Landover, Maryland
Disc 1
"Bertha" (Jerry Garcia, Robert Hunter) – 5:27
"New Minglewood Blues" (Noah Lewis) – 4:49
"Ramble On Rose" (Garcia, Hunter) – 7:11
"Cassidy" (Bob Weir, John Barlow) – 4:43
"Brown-Eyed Woman" (Garcia, Hunter) – 4:56
"Mama Tried" (Merle Haggard) – 2:49
"Peggy-O" (trad., arr. Grateful Dead) – 9:41
"Loser" (Garcia, Hunter) – 8:18
"Let It Grow" (Weir, Barlow) – 12:26
"Sugaree" (Garcia, Hunter) – 11:01
"Lazy Lightning" -> (Weir, Barlow) – 2:53
"Supplication" (Weir, Barlow) – 4:37
Notes

Disc 2
"Mississippi Half-Step Uptown Toodeloo" (Garcia, Hunter) – 11:28
"Dancing in the Street" -> (Marvin Gaye, Ivy Jo Hunter, William "Mickey" Stevenson)   – 12:43
"Cosmic Charlie" (Garcia, Hunter) – 8:39
"Scarlet Begonias" (Garcia, Hunter) – 11:07
"St. Stephen" -> (Garcia, Phil Lesh, Hunter) – 4:12
"Not Fade Away" -> (Norman Petty, Charles Hardin) – 9:57
"Drums" -> (Hart, Kreutzmann) – 3:34
"Jam" -> (Grateful Dead) – 2:05
"St. Stephen" -> (Garcia, Lesh, Hunter) – 2:03
"Sugar Magnolia" (Weir, Hunter) – 9:40
Notes

September 28, 1976 – Onondaga County War Memorial, Syracuse, New York
Disc 3
"Cold Rain and Snow" (trad., arr. Grateful Dead) – 6:36
"Big River" (Johnny Cash) – 5:55
"Cassidy" (Weir, Barlow) – 4:33
"Tennessee Jed" (Garcia, Hunter) – 8:37
"New Minglewood Blues" (Lewis) – 6:06
"Candyman" (Garcia, Hunter) – 7:25
"It's All Over Now" (Bobby Womack, Shirley Jean Womack) –  6:40
"Friend of the Devil" (Garcia, John Dawson, Hunter) – 8:44
"Let It Grow" -> (Weir, Barlow) – 11:41
"Goin' Down the Road Feeling Bad" (trad., arr. Grateful Dead) – 9:14

Disc 4
"Playing in the Band" -> (Weir, Hart, Hunter) – 10:40
"The Wheel" -> (Garcia, Hunter) – 7:07
"Samson and Delilah" -> (trad., arr. Weir) – 8:01
"Jam" -> (Grateful Dead) – 5:40
"Comes a Time" -> (Garcia, Hunter) – 7:50
"Drums" -> (Hart, Kreutzmann) – 4:58
"Eyes of the World" -> (Garcia, Hunter) – 8:39
"Orange Tango Jam" -> (Grateful Dead) – 4:46
"Dancing in the Street" -> (Gaye, I.J. Hunter, Stevenson)  – 9:15
"Playing in the Band" (Weir, Hart, Hunter) – 5:06
"Johnny B. Goode" (Chuck Berry) – 4:33
Notes

Personnel

Grateful Dead
Jerry Garcia – lead guitar, vocals
Phil Lesh – electric bass
 Bob Weir – rhythm guitar, vocals
Donna Jean Godchaux – vocals
Keith Godchaux – piano, vocals
Mickey Hart – drums
Bill Kreutzmann – drums

Production
Dan Healy – live recording
Dick Latvala – tape archivist
David Lemieux – tape archivist
Jeffrey Norman – CD mastering
Eileen Law/Grateful Dead Archives – archival research
Ed Perlstein – photography
Tina Carpenter – cover art and design
David DeNoma – cover photos
Bob Minkin – special thanks

References

20
2001 live albums
Grateful Dead Records live albums